Annke Conradi (born 30 August 1965) is a German Paralympic swimmer who specialises in backstroke and freestyle and is a double world and Paralympic champion.

References

External links
 
 
 

1965 births
Living people
German female freestyle swimmers
German female backstroke swimmers
S3-classified Paralympic swimmers
Paralympic swimmers of Germany
Paralympic medalists in swimming
Paralympic gold medalists for Germany
Paralympic silver medalists for Germany
Paralympic bronze medalists for Germany
Swimmers at the 1996 Summer Paralympics
Swimmers at the 2000 Summer Paralympics
Swimmers at the 2004 Summer Paralympics
Swimmers at the 2008 Summer Paralympics
Swimmers at the 2012 Summer Paralympics
Swimmers at the 2016 Summer Paralympics
Medalists at the 1996 Summer Paralympics
Medalists at the 2000 Summer Paralympics
Medalists at the 2004 Summer Paralympics
Medalists at the World Para Swimming Championships
20th-century German women
21st-century German women